Kriventsov, female form Kriventsova, is a Russian surname.

Notable people with this surname include:
 Stanislav Kriventsov (born 1973), Russian chess master
 Valeriy Kriventsov (born 1973), Ukrainian footballer

Russian-language surnames